Marutadi is a village in the Kumbakonam taluk of Thanjavur district, Tamil Nadu, India.

Demographics 

As per the 2001 census, Marutadi had a total population of 209 with 107 males and 102 females. The sex ratio was 953. The literacy rate was 82.16

References 

 

Villages in Thanjavur district